"Kooda" (stylized in all caps) is a song recorded by American rapper 6ix9ine for his debut mixtape Day69 (2018). It was released commercially on December 3, 2017, for streaming and digital download, through ScumGang Records. The song was written by 6ix9ine himself and produced by Koncept P. It peaked at number 50 on the US Billboard Hot 100.

Background and release 
"Kooda" is the second single by 6ix9ine from his debut mixtape Day69 (2018). The song references ScumGang Records, Xanax, Ruger, and Fendi, among others. It debuted at number 61 on the US Billboard Hot 100 the week of December 23, 2017, and peaked at number 50.

Music video 
An accompanying music video for the song premiered on WorldStarHipHop via its official YouTube channel. It features Tekashi 6ix9ine in the streets of the Bedford-Stuyvesant neighborhood in Brooklyn with members of the Bloods and Crips street gangs, in a similar vein to the music video for "Gummo". "I got the best videos in America with no budget," Tekashi 6ix9ine proclaimed to Mass Appeal in an interview. "These industry videos got 50K to 100K and I work with zero dollars."

Charts

Weekly charts

Year-End charts

Certifications

References

External links 
  on SoundCloud

2017 singles
2017 songs
6ix9ine songs
Songs written by 6ix9ine
Trap music songs

Gangsta rap songs
Hardcore hip hop songs